José Manuel Donoso Yáñez (5 October 1924 – 7 December 1996), known as José Donoso, was a Chilean writer, journalist and professor. He lived most of his life in Chile, although he spent many years in self-imposed exile in Mexico, the United States and Spain. Although he had left his country in the sixties for personal reasons, after 1973 he said his exile was also a form of protest against the dictatorship of Augusto Pinochet. He returned to Chile in 1981 and lived there until his death.

Donoso is the author of a number of short stories and novels, which contributed greatly to the Latin American literary boom. His best known works include the novels Coronación (Coronation), El lugar sin límites (Hell Has No Limits) and El obsceno pájaro de la noche (The Obscene Bird of Night). His works deal with a number of themes, including sexuality, the duplicity of identity, psychology, and a sense of dark humor.

Early life
Donoso was born in Santiago to the physician José Donoso Donoso and Alicia Yáñez (Eliodoro Yáñez's niece). He studied in The Grange School, where he was classmates with Luis Alberto Heiremans and Carlos Fuentes, and in Liceo José Victorino Lastarria (José Victorino Lastarria High School). Coming from a comfortable family, during his childhood he worked as a juggler and an office worker, much before he developed as a writer and teacher.

In 1945 he traveled to the southernmost part of Chile and Argentina, where he worked on sheep farms in the province of Magallanes. Two years later, he finished high school and signed up to study English in the Institute of Teaching in the Universidad de Chile (University of Chile). In 1949, thanks to a scholarship from the Doherty Foundation, he changed to studying English literature at Princeton University, where he studied under such professors as R. P. Blackmur, Lawrence Thompson and Allan Tate. The Princeton magazine, MSS, published his first two stories, both written in English: "The Blue Woman" (1950) and "The Poisoned Pastries" (1951). Donoso graduated with a Bachelor of Arts in English from Princeton in 1951 after completing a senior thesis titled "The Elegance of Mind of Jane Austen. An Interpretation of Her Novels Through the Attitudes of Heroines."

Career
In 1951, he traveled to Mexico and Central America. He then returned to Chile and in 1954 started teaching English at the Universidad Católica (Catholic University) and in the Kent School.

His first book, Veraneo y otros cuentos (Summer Vacation and Other Stories), was published in 1955 and won the Premio Municipal de Santiago (Municipal Prize of Santiago) the following year. In 1957, while he lived with a family of fishermen in the Isla Negra, he published his first novel, Coronación (Coronation), in which he described the high Santiaguina classes and their decadence. Eight years later, it was translated and published in the United States by Alfred A Knopf and in England by The Bodley Head.

In 1958, he left Chile for Buenos Aires, returning to Chile in 1960.

He started writing for the magazine Revista Ercilla in 1959 when he found himself traveling through Europe, from where he sent his reports. He continued as an editor and literary critic of that publication until 1964. He was also a co-editor of the Mexican journal Siempre.

In 1961, he married the painter, writer and translator María del Pilar Serrano (1925–1997), also known as María Esther Serrano Mendieta, daughter of Juan Enrique Serrano Pellé from Chile and Graciela Mendieta Alvarez from Bolivia. Donoso had previously met her in Buenos Aires.

They left Chile again in 1965 for Mexico and later Donoso was a writer-in-residence at the University of Iowa from 1965 to 1967, when he moved with his wife to Spain. In 1968, the couple adopted a three-month-old girl from Madrid, whom they named María del Pilar Donoso Serrano, best known as Pilar Donoso.

In the Summer term, 1975, Donoso taught a workshop in writing the novel in the Comparative Literature Department at Dartmouth College, Hanover, New Hampshire USA.  In 1981, after his return to Chile, he conducted a literature workshop in the which, during the first period, many writers like Roberto Brodsky, Marco Antonio de la Parra, Carlos Franz, Carlos Iturra, Eduardo Llanos, Marcelo Maturana, Sonia Montecino Aguirre, Darío Oses, Roberto Rivera and, very fleetingly, Jaime Collyer, Gonzalo Contreras, and Jorge Marchant Lazcano, among others. Later, Arturo Fontaine Talavera, Alberto Fuguet and Ágata Gligo attended, among others.

At the same time, he continued publishing novels, even though they didn't receive the same repercussions as preceding works: La desesperanza (Curfew), the novellas Taratuta and Naturaleza muerta con cachimba (Still Life with Pipe) and Donde van a morir los elefantes (1995). El mocho (1997) and Lagartija sin cola (The Lizard's Tale) were published posthumously.

Death
José Donoso died of liver cancer in his house in Santiago, 7 December 1996 at the age of 72. On his deathbed, according to popular belief, he asked that they read him the poems of Altazor of Vicente Huidobro. His remains were buried in the cemetery of a spa located in the province of Petorca, 80 kilometers from Valparaíso.

In 2009, his daughter, Pilar Donoso, published a biography of her father titled Correr el tupido velo (Drawing the Veil), based on her father's private diaries, notes and letters, as well as Pilar's own memories.

Bibliography

Novels 

 Coronación (Nascimento, 1957). Coronation, translated by Jocasta Goodwin (The Bodley Head; Knopf, 1965).
Este domingo (Zig-Zag, 1966). This Sunday, translated by Lorraine O'Grady Freeman (Knopf, 1967).
 El lugar sin límites (1966). Hell Has No Limits, translated by Suzanne Jill Levine in Triple Cross (Dutton, 1972) and later as a revised translation (Sun & Moon Press, 1995).
El obsceno pájaro de la noche (Seix Barral, 1970). The Obscene Bird of Night, translated by Hardie St. Martin and Leonard Mades (Knopf, 1973).
Casa de campo (Seix Barral, 1978). A House in the Country, translated by David Pritchard and Suzanne Jill Levine (Knopf, 1984).
La misteriosa desaparición de la marquesita de Loria (1981). The Mysterious Disappearance of the Marquesita de Loria.
El jardín de al lado (1981). The Garden Next Door, translated by Hardie St. Martin (Grove, 1992).
La desesperanza (Seix Barral, 1986). Curfew, translated by Alfred MacAdam (George Weidenfeld & Nicolson, 1988).
Donde van a morir los elefantes (1995). Where the Elephants Will Die.
El mocho (posthumous, 1997). The Mocho.
Lagartija sin cola (posthumous, 2007). The Lizard's Tale, edited by Julio Ortega and translated by Suzanne Jill Levine (Northwestern University Press, 2011).

Novellas 

 Tres novelitas burguesas (Seix Barral, 1973). Sacred Families: Three Novellas, translated by Andrée Conrad (Knopf, 1977; Gollancz, 1978).
Contains: Chatanooga choochoo (Chattanooga Choo-Choo), Átomo verde número cinco (Green Atom Number Five) and Gaspard de la Nuit.
 Cuatro para Delfina (Seix Barral, 1982).
Contains: Sueños de mala muerte, Los habitantes de una ruina inconclusa, El tiempo perdido and Jolie Madame
 Taratuta y Naturaleza muerta con cachimba (Mondadori, 1990). Taratuta and Still Life with Pipe, translated by Gregory Rabassa (W. W. Norton, 1993).
 Nueve novelas breves (Alfaguara, 1996).
Compiles Tres novelitas burguesas, Cuatro para Delfina and Taratuta y Naturaleza muerta con cachimba

Short story collections 

 Veraneo y otros cuentos (1955). Summertime and Other Stories.
Contains seven stories: "Veraneo" ("Summertime"), "Tocayos" ("Namesakes"), "El Güero" ("The Güero"), "Una señora" ("A Lady"), "Fiesta en grande" ("Big Party"), "Dos cartas" ("Two Letters") and "Dinamarquero" ("The Dane's Place").
Republished as Veraneo y sus mejores cuentos (Zig-Zag, 1985), with three additional stories: "Paseo", "El hombrecito" and "Santelices".
 El charleston (1960).
Contains five stories: "El charleston" ("Charleston"), "La puerta cerrada" ("The Closed Door"), "Ana María", "Paseo" ("The Walk") and "El hombrecito" ("The Little Man").
 Los mejores cuentos de José Donoso (Zig-Zag, 1966). The Best Stories of José Donoso. Selection by Luis Domínguez.
Contains: "Veraneo", "Tocayos", "El Güero", "Una señora", "Fiesta en grande", "Dos cartas", "Dinamarquero", "El charleston", "La puerta cerrada", "Ana María", "Paseo", "El hombrecito", "China" and "Santelices".
Republished as Cuentos (Seix Barral, 1973; Alfaguara, 1998; Penguin, 2015).
Charleston and Other Stories, translated by Andrée Conrad (Godine, 1977).
Contains nine stories from Cuentos: "Ana María", "Summertime", "The Güero", "A Lady", "The Walk", "The Closed Door", "The Dane's Place", "Charleston" and "Santelices".

Poems 

 Poemas de un novelista (1981)

Other 

Historia personal del "boom" (1972). The Boom in Spanish American Literature: A Personal History, translated by Gregory Kolovakos (1977).
Artículos de incierta necesidad (1998). Selection of his articles published for magazines compiled by Cecilia García-Huidobro.
Conjeturas sobre la memoria de mi tribu (fictional memories, 1996). Conjectures About the Memory of My Tribe.
Diarios tempranos. Donoso in progress, 1950-1965 (2016)

Awards and honors 

 1956: Premio Municipal de Santiago
 1962: William Faulkner Foundation Prize for Latin American Literature
 1969: Premio Pedro de Oña (Spain)
 1978: Premio de la Crítica de narrativa castellana (Spain)
 1990: Premio Mondello (Italy)
 1990: Premio Nacional de Literatura en Chile
 1991: Prix Roger Caillois (France)
 1995: Caballero Gran Cruz de la Orden del Mérito Civil (Spain)

Further reading

English
The Underside of Power: Reading the Fantastic in the Works of the Chilean Writer José Donoso / Andrew M. Corley., 2017. Retrieved from https://scholarcommons.sc.edu/etd/4331
The self in the narratives of José Donoso: Chile, 1924–1996 / Mary Lusky Friedman., 2004
The veracity of disguise in selected works of José Donoso: illusory deception / Brent J Carbajal., 2000
José Donoso's house of fiction: a dramatic construction of time and place / Flora María González Mandri., 1995
Understanding José Donoso / Sharon Magnarelli., 1993
Studies on the works of José Donoso: an anthology of critical essays / Miriam Adelstein., 1990
José Donoso, the "boom" and beyond / Philip Swanson., 1988
The creative process in the works of José Donoso / Guillermo I Castillo-Feliú., 1982
José Donoso (Twayne's World Authors Series) / George R McMurray., 1979

Spanish
Racionalidad e imaginación: transposiciones del cuerpo y de la mente en los cuentos de José Donoso / Sergio Véliz., 2001
Las últimas obras de José Donoso: juegos, roles y rituales en la subversión del poder / Michael Colvin., 2001
Donoso sin límites / Carlos Cerda., 1997
José Donoso, escritura y subversión del significado / Laura A Chesak., 1997
José Donoso: desde el texto al metatexto / Enrique Luengo., 1992
El simbolismo en la obra de José Donoso / Augusto C Sarrochi., 1992
José Donoso, impostura e impostación / Ricardo Gutiérrez Mouat., 1983
José Donoso: incursiones en su producción novelesca / Myrna Solotorevsky., 1983
Ideología y estructuras narrativas en José Donoso, 1950–1970 / Hugo Achugar., 1979
José Donoso: una insurrección contra la realidad / Isis Quinteros., 1978
José Donoso: la destrucción de un mundo / José Promis Ojeda., 1975

References

External links
 memoriachilena.cl Donoso, José
 The Jose Donoso Papers are housed at the University of Iowa Special Collections & University Archives.
Jose Donoso recorded at the Library of Congress for the Hispanic Division’s audio literary archive on April 8, 1975

1924 births
1996 deaths
Chilean male novelists
Gay novelists
Chilean gay writers
Magic realism writers
Chilean LGBT novelists
National Prize for Literature (Chile) winners
People from Santiago
20th-century Chilean novelists
Prix Roger Caillois recipients
International Writing Program alumni
20th-century Chilean male writers
20th-century Chilean LGBT people
Deaths from cancer in Chile
Deaths from liver cancer